David Gwillim (born 15 December 1948) is an English actor, known for playing Prince Hal in the BBC Television Shakespeare adaptations of Henry IV, Part I and Henry IV, Part II and the title role in Henry V which were broadcast in 1979, and as John Bold in The Barchester Chronicles broadcast in 1982.

In 2021 David Gwillim contributed to, and participated in, a YouTube documentary tribute to Alfred Burke entitled Alfred Burke is Frank Marker

Biography 
Gwillim was born in Plymouth.  He is the son of Jack Gwillim. His sister Sarah-Jane Gwillim and half brother Jaxon Duff Gwillim are also actors.

David Gwillim married actress Lynn Dearth in 1974; she died in 1994. His second wife is actress Deirdra Morris, whom he married in 1997.

Filmography

References 
Henry IV, Part 1 from British Film Institute archive
Henry IV, Part 2 from British Film Institute archive
Henry V from British Film Institute archive

External links 
 

Living people
1948 births
20th-century English male actors
21st-century English male actors
English male film actors
English male television actors
Male actors from Plymouth, Devon